Stephen Lunn (born 12 March 1956) is a former Australian rules footballer who played for Footscray and Geelong over five seasons in the Victorian Football League (VFL).

His father, Ron Lunn, was also an Australian rules footballer for Geelong and Essendon.

References

External links

1956 births
Living people
Western Bulldogs players
Geelong Football Club players
Geelong West Football Club players
Australian rules footballers from Victoria (Australia)